Madeline Gail Kahn (née Wolfson; September 29, 1942 – December 3, 1999) was an American actress, comedian and singer, known for comedic roles in films directed by Peter Bogdanovich and Mel Brooks, including What's Up, Doc? (1972), Young Frankenstein (1974), High Anxiety (1977), History of the World, Part I (1981), and her Academy Award–nominated roles in Paper Moon (1973) and Blazing Saddles (1974).

Kahn made her Broadway debut in Leonard Sillman's New Faces of 1968, and received Tony Award nominations for the play In the Boom Boom Room in 1974 and for the original production of the musical On the Twentieth Century in 1978. She starred as Madeline Wayne on the short-lived sitcom Oh Madeline (1983–84) and won a Daytime Emmy Award in 1987 for an ABC Afterschool Special. She received a third Tony Award nomination for the revival of the play Born Yesterday in 1989, before winning the 1993 Tony Award for Best Actress in a Play for the comedy The Sisters Rosensweig. Her other film appearances included The Cheap Detective (1978), City Heat (1984), Clue (1985), and Nixon (1995).

Early life and education

Kahn was born in Boston, the daughter of Bernard B. Wolfson, a garment manufacturer, and his wife Freda (née Goldberg). She was raised in a nonobservant Jewish family. Her parents divorced when Kahn was two, and she moved with  her mother to New York City. In 1953, Freda married Hiller Kahn, who later adopted Madeline; Freda eventually changed her own name to Paula Kahn. Madeline Kahn had two half-siblings: Jeffrey (from her mother's marriage to Kahn) and Robyn (from her father's second marriage).

In 1948, Kahn was sent to the progressive Manumit School, a boarding school in Bristol, Pennsylvania. During that time, her mother pursued her acting dream. Kahn soon began acting herself, and performed in a number of school productions. In 1960, she graduated from Martin Van Buren High School in Queens, New York, and then earned a drama scholarship to Hofstra University on Long Island. At Hofstra, she studied drama, music, and speech therapy. Kahn graduated from Hofstra in 1964 with a degree in speech therapy. She was a member of a local sorority on campus, Delta Chi Delta.  She later studied singing in New York City with Beverley Peck Johnson.

Career
When asked on television by Kitty Carlisle and Charles Nelson Reilly how she began the opera aspect of her career, Kahn said: It's so hard to determine exactly when I began or why, singing. The Muse was definitely not in attendance. I'll tell you exactly.

To earn money while a college student, Kahn was a singing waitress at a Bavarian restaurant named Bavarian Manor, a Hofbräuhaus in New York's Hudson Valley. She sang musical comedy numbers during shows.

<blockquote>There was a really important customer there, a big Italian man, who shouted out to me 'Sing Madame Butterfly''', and of course he didn't mean the whole opera. He meant that one very popular aria 'un Bel Di'. So if I was to come back the next summer to earn more money during the next year I'd better know that aria. You know, and I didn't know anything about it; I just learned that one aria and a few others and then one thing led to another and I studied that, and I discovered that I could sing that, sort of, that way. But my first actual thing that I did was Candide for Leonard Bernstein's 50th birthday at Philharmonic Hall—at the time that's what it was called. And I don't know if that was an opera, but it was very hard to sing. I actually have done Musetta in La Bohème a long time ago in Washington, DC. I mean, utterly terrifying. I mean basically I feel as though I was asked to do it and I did it.</blockquote>

1960s
Kahn began auditioning for professional acting roles shortly after her graduation from Hofstra; on the side, she briefly taught public school. Just before adopting the professional name Madeline Kahn (Kahn was her stepfather's surname), she made her stage debut as a chorus girl in a revival of Kiss Me, Kate, which led her to join Actors' Equity. Her part in the flop How Now, Dow Jones was written out before the 1967 show reached Broadway.

In 1968, Kahn performed her first professional lead in a special concert performance of the operetta Candide in honor of Leonard Bernstein's 50th birthday. She made her Broadway debut in 1968 with Leonard Sillman's New Faces of 1968 and also appeared Off-Broadway in the musical Promenade.

1970s and 1980s
Kahn appeared in two Broadway musicals in the 1970s: a featured role in Richard Rodgers' 1970 Noah's Ark-themed show Two by Two (singing a high C) and a leading lady turn as Lily Garland in 1978's On the Twentieth Century. She left (or, reportedly, was fired from) the latter show early in its run, yielding the role to understudy Judy Kaye.Corry, John. "Broadway; Terrence McNally has a comedy about stage due in fall", The New York Times, May 5, 1978, p. C2 She starred in a 1977 Town Hall semi-staged concert version of She Loves Me (opposite Barry Bostwick and original London cast member Rita Moreno).Madison, William V. She Loves Me Madeline Kahn: Being the Music, A Life, (books.google.com), Univ. Press of Mississippi, 2015, 

Kahn's film debut was in the 1968 short De Düva (The Dove). Her feature debut was as Ryan O'Neal's character's hysterical fiancée in Peter Bogdanovich's screwball comedy What's Up, Doc? (1972) starring Barbra Streisand. Her film career continued with Paper Moon (1973), for which she was nominated for an Academy Award for Best Supporting Actress.

Kahn was cast in the role of Agnes Gooch in the 1974 film Mame, but star Lucille Ball fired Kahn due to artistic differences. (Several of Ball's biographies say Kahn was eager to be released from the role so that she could join the cast of Blazing Saddles, a film about to go into production; however, Kahn stated in a 1996 interview with Charlie Rose that she was fired.)

A close succession of comedies — Blazing Saddles (1974), Young Frankenstein (1974), and High Anxiety (1977) — were all directed by Mel Brooks, who was able to bring out the best of Kahn's comic talents. Their last collaboration was 1981's History of the World, Part I. For Blazing Saddles, she was again nominated for an Academy Award for Best Supporting Actress. In the April 2006 issue of Premiere magazine, her performance in Blazing Saddles as Lili von Shtupp was selected as number 74 on its list of the 100 greatest performances of all time.

In 1975, Kahn again teamed with Bogdanovich to co-star with Burt Reynolds and Cybill Shepherd in the musical At Long Last Love. The film was a critical and financial disaster, but Kahn largely escaped blame for the failure. In that same year, she again teamed with Gene Wilder, this time for his comedy The Adventure of Sherlock Holmes' Smarter Brother. In 1978, Kahn's comic screen persona reached another peak with her portrayal of Mrs. Montenegro in Neil Simon's The Cheap Detective (1978), a spoof of both Casablanca and The Maltese Falcon, directed by Robert Moore. That role was followed by a cameo in 1979's The Muppet Movie.Kahn's roles were primarily comedic rather than dramatic, although the 1970s found her originating roles in two plays that had elements of both: 1973's In the Boom Boom Room on Broadway and 1977's Marco Polo Sings a Solo Off-Broadway.

After her success in Brooks' films, Kahn appeared in a number of films in the 1980s. She played Mrs. White in 1985's Clue, First Lady Constance Link in the 1980 spoof First Family, a twin from outer space in the Jerry Lewis sci-fi comedy Slapstick of Another Kind (1982), the love interest of Burt Reynolds in the crime comedy City Heat (1984), and Draggle in the animated film My Little Pony: The Movie (1986). She voiced the character Gussie Mausheimer in the animated film An American Tail. According to animator Don Bluth, she was cast because he was "hoping she would use a voice similar to the one she used as a character in Mel Brooks' Blazing Saddles."

In 1983, Kahn starred in her own short-lived TV sitcom Oh Madeline, which ended after one season due to poor ratings. In 1986, she starred in ABC Comedy Factory's pilot of Chameleon, which never aired on the fall schedule. In 1987, Kahn won a Daytime Emmy award for her performance in the ABC Afterschool Special Wanted: The Perfect Guy.

Kahn returned to the stage as Billie Dawn in the 1989 Broadway revival of Born Yesterday, and was nominated for the Tony Award for Best Actress in a Play.

1990s
Kahn played the mother of Molly Ringwald's character in the 1990 film Betsy's Wedding, and shortly after she recorded a voice for the unreleased animated movie The Magic 7. In 1994, she portrayed suicide hotline worker Blanche Munchnik in the holiday farce Mixed Nuts. Kahn played the corrupt mayor in a benefit concert performance of Anyone Can Whistle in 1995. She appeared in Nixon as Martha Beall Mitchell (1995).

On stage, Kahn played Dr. Gorgeous in Wendy Wasserstein's 1993 play (on Broadway) The Sisters Rosensweig, a role for which she earned a Tony Award for Best Actress in a Play.
 She was a member of the cast of Cosby (1996–1999) as Pauline, the eccentric friend and neighbor.  

Kahn participated in a workshop reading of Dear World at the Roundabout Theatre Company in June 1998, reading the part of Gabrielle. She also voiced Gypsy the moth in A Bug's Life (1998).

Kahn received good reviews for her Chekhovian turn in the 1999 independent movie Judy Berlin, her final film. Before her passing, she also worked on the first two episodes of Little Bill, voicing Mrs. Shapiro. The second episode ("Just a Baby" / "The Camp Out"), the final installment for which she voiced Mrs. Shapiro, was dedicated to her memory. Kathy Najimy succeeded her in the role of Mrs. Shapiro following Kahn's death.

Illness and death
Kahn was diagnosed with ovarian cancer in 1998. She underwent treatment, continued to work on Cosby'', and married John Hansbury in Summer 1999. However, the disease spread rapidly, and she died on December 3, 1999, at age 57.

She was cremated on December 6, at Garden State Crematory in North Bergen, New Jersey. A bench dedicated to her memory was erected in Central Park by her husband John and her brother Jeffrey. The bench is located near the Jacqueline Kennedy Onassis Reservoir on West 87th Street.

Filmography

Film

Television

Theater

Awards and nominations
Year given is year of ceremony

References

External links

 
 
 
 
 
 Madeline Kahn, a retrospective

1942 births
1999 deaths
American film actresses
American musical theatre actresses
American stage actresses
American television actresses
American voice actresses
Daytime Emmy Award winners
Drama Desk Award winners
Hofstra University alumni
Jewish American actresses
Martin Van Buren High School alumni
Deaths from ovarian cancer
Actresses from Boston
Actresses from New York City
American women comedians
Deaths from cancer in New York (state)
Tony Award winners
20th-century American actresses
20th-century American comedians
20th-century American singers
Comedians from New York City
Jewish American female comedians
20th-century American women singers
20th-century American Jews